Baphala haywardi is a species of snout moth in the genus Baphala. It was described by Carl Heinrich in 1956 and is found in Argentina.

The wingspan is 15–16 mm.

The larvae feed on the scale insect Ceroplastes grandis.

References

Moths described in 1956
Phycitinae